Ichneumonini is a tribe of ichneumon wasps in the family Ichneumonidae. There are more than 350 genera and thousands of described species in Ichneumonini.

See also
 List of Ichneumonini genera

References

External links

 

Ichneumoninae
Hymenoptera tribes